A Little Rhythm and a Wicked Feeling is the fourth extended play by American synthpop duo Magdalena Bay, released on March 13, 2020, through Luminelle Recordings and The Orchard.

Promotion
The first single from the EP, "Venice", was released on August 15, 2019. The dance-pop song was accompanied by a "highly cinematic" music video described as a "dreamy and strange slice of pop escapism". "Good Intentions" was released on September 26, 2019 and described as "a crying at the club-type of song" that "looks back on a relationship and sways between acceptance and flashes of emotion." Third single "Killshot" arrived on October 30, 2019, followed by "Oh Hell" on December 12, 2019. The latter song is an "emotional indie ballad" whose video features singer Mica Tennenbaum singing underwater. Fifth single "How to Get Physical" was released on January 13, 2020 and was described as "a bold, inspired song that tackles that awkward feeling of not having the self-confidence to just let loose and dance".

Critical reception 
Pitchfork contributor Ashley Bardham wrote of the EP, "Rather than obscuring emotion, their manufactured sound invokes its own kind of nostalgic joy. A Little Rhythm and a Wicked Feeling is a reminder that exaggeration or artificiality don’t have to mean soullessness; pop music is supposed to be a loud, flashy monument to earnest, embarrassing emotion. Listen to it shamelessly, euphorically, with love in your heart."

Track listing

References 

2020 EPs
The Orchard (company) albums
Bubblegum pop albums
Magdalena Bay (group) albums